Ko Lanta Yai is an island in the Strait of Malacca off the west coast of Thailand, between the Phi Phi Islands and the mainland. It is administratively part of Krabi Province, most of which is on the mainland.
Together with neighboring Ko Lanta Noi, which forms Ko Lanta archipelago and several other islands it forms the amphoe of Ko Lanta District.
The area was designated as the 62nd national park of Thailand in 1990.

Recently, it has become well known, especially in Sweden. The island is relatively less developed with most of the accommodation available being basic bamboo huts. In 2015, a new bridge was built connecting it to the island of Ko Lanta Noi. There are very few paved roads on the island, mostly in the north, and they deteriorate gradually towards the south.

Ban Saladan, the main town and port, is at the northern tip of the island and is served by ferries from Krabi, Phuket, and Phi Phi. The main beaches are on the western shores of the island, the largest being Klong Dao, Pra-Ae (Long Beach), and Klong Khong Beach. There are other, much less accessible, beaches at the southern end.

Lanta escaped the worst of the 2004 Indian Ocean earthquake. Although there was widespread devastation along the west coast, significantly fewer injuries and fatalities were reported in comparison to the Phi Phi Islands. It is thought 11 people lost their lives. Assisted by tourists, most businesses were up and running within a few days.

References

External links

Lanta Yai
Lanta Yai
Geography of Krabi province